Ulrike Kaiser (born 10 January 1978) is a Liechtenstein judoka. She competed in the women's half-lightweight event at the 2000 Summer Olympics.

References

1978 births
Living people
Liechtenstein female judoka
Olympic judoka of Liechtenstein
Judoka at the 2000 Summer Olympics
People from the canton of St. Gallen